Mount Austin is a conspicuous rock mass rising to , projecting into the head of Gardner Inlet, on the east coast of Palmer Land, Antarctica. Discovered by the Ronne Antarctic Research Expedition (RARE), 1947–48, under Ronne, and named by him for Stephen F. Austin, American colonizer in Texas and one of the founders of the Republic of Texas.

Peaks near Mount Austin include: Mount Wood, Mount Robertson, Mount Owen, Mount Nash, Mount Tricorn, and Arctowski peak.

References

Mountains of Palmer Land